Aloha is an unincorporated community in Grant Parish, Louisiana, United States.

History
The community was named after the Hawaiian greeting and parting phrase aloha. The name was likely inspired by the song "Aloha ʻOe".

References

Unincorporated communities in Grant Parish, Louisiana
Unincorporated communities in Louisiana